Esmond Burman Lewis (5 January 1918 – 19 October 1983) was an English wicket-keeper who played first-class cricket for Warwickshire from 1949 to 1958.

He began playing for the Warwickshire Second XI in 1936 but had to wait 13 years for his first-class debut. When he finally played, against Oxford University in 1949, he took eight catches and a stumping, setting a Warwickshire record. However, he had to remain the county's reserve wicket-keeper, because the regular wicket-keeper, Dick Spooner, was a better batsman.

Lewis played as an amateur, and was selected three times to keep wicket for the Gentlemen against the Players.

References

External links
 Esmond Lewis at CricketArchive
 

1918 births
1983 deaths
English cricketers
Warwickshire cricketers
Gentlemen cricketers
D. R. Jardine's XI cricketers
Wicket-keepers